Carlos Cámara Jr. (born 1 December 1956) is a Venezuelan actor. He appeared in more than twenty telenovelas since 1981. Cámara was born into a family of actors.

Selected filmography

References

External links 

1956 births
Living people
Venezuelan male television actors
Venezuelan people of Dominican Republic descent